Intrum Justitia is a Volvo Ocean 60 yacht. She finished second in the W60 class of the 1993–94 Whitbread Round the World Race skippered by Lawrie Smith.

References

Volvo Ocean Race yachts
Volvo Ocean 60 yachts
1990s sailing yachts
Sailboat type designs by Bruce Farr